Saadallah Al-Jabiri Square is the central town square at the heart of the Syrian city of Aleppo. It is the most important square in the city, experiencing most of the celebrations and festivals in Aleppo. The square is named after former Prime Minister and statesman Saadallah al-Jabiri.

The square and its surrounding buildings have been heavily damaged during October 2012 Aleppo bombings. 

After several renovations to the square, an "I love Aleppo" monument was built near the martyrs' memorial and later revealed on 29 July 2017.

Overview
The square is adjacent to the Aleppo Public Park, intersected by Majd al-Deen al-Jabiri street from the east and Kamel al-Ghazzi street from the west. It took its name from the Syrian patriotic leader, politician and Prime Minister Saadallah al-Jabiri. A monument dedicated to the Syrian martyrs is erected in the northern forehead of the square. It is from the work of the Syrian sculptor Abd al-Rahman Mowqat, who is a native of Aleppo. This monument was made in the years 1984-1985 from Aleppine yellow stone. In addition, the square covers. Parts of the stream bed of Queiq River are covered by the square and the adjacent roads and buildings.

In February 2010, the Aleppo City Council announced its intention to launch a rehabilitation process in the square, which was intended to play an important role in the solution of the traffic congestion in the centre of the city.

Gallery

See also
Aleppo
Saadallah al-Jabiri

References

Squares in Aleppo
National squares